"Without You" is a rock song written by the group Van Halen for their 1998 album Van Halen III. It was the first of three singles from the album, as well as the first to feature Gary Cherone on vocals. The track debuted at number one on the Billboard Mainstream Rock Tracks chart, the second in the magazine's history to do so (after Rush's "Stick It Out" in 1993). It is the band's last single to reach the peak position.

The "Without You" music video cost over $1,000,000 to make. The band footage for the music video was shot in Los Angeles, California, over January 28–29, 1998. The remaining footage was shot inside the Icehotel in Sweden, with model Morag Dickson. The video premiered on MTV on March 2, 1998.

Track listing

Charts

References

Van Halen songs
1998 songs
1998 singles
Songs written by Gary Cherone
Songs written by Eddie Van Halen
Songs written by Michael Anthony (musician)
Songs written by Alex Van Halen
Warner Records singles
Song recordings produced by Mike Post